The women's discus throw was an event at the 1956 Summer Olympics in Melbourne, Australia. The qualification round mark was set at 42.00 metres. Nine competitors failed to reach that distance.

Summary
In the final, Irina Beglyakova broke Nina Ponomaryeva's 4 year old Olympic record with a 51.74m.  American Earlene Brown was not far off the old record with 51.35m, the only one interrupting the top three Soviet throwers.  In the second round, defending champion Ponomaryeva improved to 51.61m, better than her previous record, to take over silver position.  In the third round, Olga Fikotová improved on the record with a 52.04m, but her lead and record were short lived as Beglyakova improved it again to 52.54m.  In the fourth round, Fikotová improved to 52.28m, but still was in second place.  In the fifth round, Ponomaryeva got off her best throw of 52.02m, but it only improved her hold on bronze.  Then Fikotová threw the winner. , over a meter past Beglyakova for another Olympic record.  Beglyakova had no answer, settling for silver.

In a much publicized Olympic romance, Fikotová would marry American hammer throw champion, Hal Connolly.  After moving to the United States, she was refused permission to continue to throw for Czechoslovakia by the country's communist authorities.  As Olga Connolly, she would represent USA in the next four Olympics.

Final classification

References

External links
 Official Report
 Results

W
Discus throw at the Olympics
1956 in women's athletics
Ath